Randy Fenoli is an American television presenter and fashion designer who is mainly known for his work on wedding dresses and his own TV show Randy to the Rescue and Say Yes to the Dress. He was the fashion director for the wedding dress store Kleinfeld Bridal from 2007 to 2012.

Biography 
Born in Mt. Vernon, Illinois, Fenoli grew up with a love of fashion and began sewing dresses when he was only nine years old, eventually expanding his efforts into the areas of make-up artistry, hair styling and entertainment. After winning the Miss Gay America competition in 1990, performing as Brandi Alexander, he used the prize money to enroll at New York's Fashion Institute of Technology.  He was offered a job working for Vivian Dessy Diamond, of the Vivian Diamond company.  Subsequently, his design experience  paid off when he was offered a job at Kleinfeld. He is now an independent consultant.

He has been a fashion designer since 1992. In 2007, Fenoli made his television debut on the U.S. cable channel TLC with Say Yes To The Dress, where his wit and fashion sensibilities charmed viewers.  Since 2011 he has hosted Say Yes to the Dress: Randy Knows Best, broadcast in Spain and Italy, and Randy to the Rescue.

Filmography 
 2007 –  present: Say Yes to the Dress, TLC
 2011–2013: Say Yes to the Dress: Randy Knows Best, TLC
 2012–2016: Randy to the Rescue, TLC
 2016: Say Yes To The Dress Benelux S1, TLC
 2017: Say Yes To The Dress Benelux S2, TLC
 2019-2020: Say Yes To The Dress America, TLC

Bibliography

References

External links 
 Official website

1964 births
Living people
American television hosts
People from Mount Vernon, Illinois
American fashion designers
Fashion Institute of Technology alumni
LGBT people from Illinois
LGBT fashion designers